Stanislav Dryanov (born 4 February 1995) is a Bulgarian footballer who plays as a midfielder for Chernomorets Burgas.

Career

Chernomorets Burgas
He made his A PFG debut on 5 October 2012 against Botev Vratsa.

Botev Plovdiv
Stanislav Dryanov signed a contract with Botev Plovdiv in June 2014.
After his excellent performances for Botev Plovdiv U21 against the U21 teams of Lokomotiv Plovdiv and CSKA Sofia Dryanov came on as a substitute for the first team of Botev Plovdiv during the 3-1 defeat from Lokomotiv Sofia in the 12th round of A Grupa.

On 7 December Dryanov came on as a substitute and played during the final 10 minutes of the 2-0 win over PFC Haskovo. On 15 March 2015 Dryanov participated in the final minutes during the important 2-0 home win of Botev Plovdiv over CSKA Sofia.

On 3 May Dryanov came on as a substitute during the 1-3 defeat from Ludogorets Razgrad and in the 80th minute missed out a clear opportunity to score. He also came on during the second halves of the next two rounds of A grupa: defeat from Litex Lovech, on 11 May, and 3-2 victory from CSKA Sofia, on 16 May. On 23 May Dryanov was included in the starting lineup for the away derby game against Beroe Stara Zagora and remained on the pitch until the 85th minute when he was replaced by Hristiyan Kazakov.

On 22 July 2015 Stanislav Dryanov was released from Botev Plovdiv on a free transfer.

Neftochimic Burgas
On 25 July Stanislav Dryanov signed а one year contract with PFC Neftochimic Burgas.

Pomorie
On 24 January 2017, Dryanov signed with Pomorie.

Club statistics

References

External links
 

1995 births
Living people
Bulgarian footballers
Bulgaria youth international footballers
PFC Chernomorets Burgas players
Botev Plovdiv players
Neftochimic Burgas players
PFC Beroe Stara Zagora players
FC Pomorie players
First Professional Football League (Bulgaria) players
Sportspeople from Burgas
Association football midfielders